Paul Labile Pogba (born 15 March 1993) is a French professional footballer who plays for  club Juventus and the France national team. He operates primarily as a central midfielder, but can be deployed as a left winger, attacking midfielder, defensive midfielder and deep-lying playmaker.

Born in Lagny-sur-Marne, Pogba joined the youth team of Ligue 2 side Le Havre in 2007, before a protracted transfer brought him to Manchester United two years later. After beginning his senior career with Manchester United two years later, limited appearances persuaded him to depart to join Italian side Juventus on a free transfer in 2012, where he helped the club to four consecutive Serie A titles, as well as two Coppa Italia and two Supercoppa Italiana titles. During his time in Italy, Pogba further established himself as one of the most promising young players in the world and received the Golden Boy award in 2013, followed by the Bravo Award in 2014. In 2016, Pogba was named to the 2015 UEFA Team of the Year and the 2015 FIFA FIFPro World XI after helping Juventus to the 2015 UEFA Champions League Final, their first in 12 years.

Pogba's performances at Juventus led to him returning to Manchester United in 2016 for a then-world record transfer fee of €105 million (£89.3 million). The fee was the highest paid by an English club until 2021. In his first season back, he won the League Cup and the Europa League. In the 2018–19 season, he was named in the PFA Team of the Year.

Internationally, Pogba captained France to victory at the 2013 FIFA U-20 World Cup and took home the award for the Best Player for his performances during the tournament. He made his debut for the senior team a year later and featured prominently at the 2014 FIFA World Cup, where he was awarded the Best Young Player Award for his performances. He later represented his nation at UEFA Euro 2016 on home soil, where he finished as a runner-up, before winning the 2018 FIFA World Cup, scoring in the final.

Early life
Pogba was born in Lagny-sur-Marne, Seine-et-Marne, France, to Guinean parents. He is a Muslim. He has two older brothers who are twins – Florentin Pogba and Mathias Pogba – born in Guinea, who are also footballers and play for the Guinean national team. Florentin currently plays as a defender for ATK Mohun Bagan, while Mathias most recently played as a forward for ASM Belfort. Growing up, Pogba was a fan of Arsenal.

Club career

Early career

Pogba began his football career at the age of six playing for US Roissy-en-Brie, a few miles south of his hometown. He spent seven seasons at the club before joining US Torcy, where he served as captain of the club's under-13 team.

After one season with Torcy, Pogba joined professional club Le Havre. In his second season at the club, Pogba captained its under-16 team to the final phase of its domestic league, the Championnat National des 16 ans. Le Havre finished second to Lens in the final group phase, finishing ahead of the likes of Lyon and Nancy. Pogba also established himself as a youth international for his country.

Manchester United

Transfer

On 31 July 2009, Pogba announced that he was departing Le Havre to join the youth academy of Manchester United in England. The move surprised his parent club, as it allegedly had a "non-solicitation agreement" with Pogba, which was agreed to by not only the player but also his parents in 2006. The agreement, which was in place until the end of the 2009–10 season, allowed Le Havre to sign Pogba to an aspirant (youth) contract once the player met specific age and scholarship requirements. On 1 August, Le Havre released an official statement on its website criticising Manchester United and the Pogba family. Le Havre also announced its intent to ask FIFA to probe the situation.

In response to Le Havre's accusations, Manchester United threatened to sue the club, while Pogba denied he was leaving Le Havre for monetary reasons, which Le Havre President Jean-Pierre Louvel had alleged to be £87,000 and a house. Le Havre was also accused by Pogba's former club Torcy of using the same tactics it purported Manchester United to have used when the club acquired Pogba from its youth academy. On the same day of Pogba's announcement to depart for England, Torcy released a press release on its official website criticising Le Havre's accusations, stating, "We will not use the term 'steal,' but the recruiters of Le Havre acted the same way with the club in Torcy." The club cited Le Havre's acceptance of allowing Pogba to sign an amateur licence with the club without notifying Torcy as its primary reason why. On 7 October, Manchester United were cleared of wrongdoing by a judge appointed by FIFA, with the declaration that Pogba was not contractually linked to Le Havre. Despite having the option to appeal, on 18 June 2010, Le Havre officials confirmed that the club had reached an agreement with Manchester United for the transfer of Pogba. The terms of the agreement were confidential.

Academy and call up to first team
Pogba completed his transfer to Manchester United on 7 October 2009 and made his debut with the club's under-18 team on 10 October against Crewe Alexandra in a 2–1 defeat. He finished the 2009–10 under-18 campaign with seven goals in 21 appearances. The team finished first in their group, but lost to Arsenal 5–3 on penalties in the play-off semi-finals. In April 2010, Pogba was a part of the under-18 team that successfully defended their title at the Torneo Calcio Memorial Claudio Sassi-Sassuolo in Bologna, Italy. In the 2010–11 season, Pogba remained on the club's academy team in the Premier Academy League and played with the team during the first three months of the season. In November 2010, he was called up to the club's reserve team and made his debut on 2 November 2010 in a 3–1 win over Bolton Wanderers. On 10 January 2011, in the FA Youth Cup, Pogba scored a long-range goal, described as a "piledriver," in the team's 3–2 victory over Portsmouth. The win allowed the team to progress to the fourth round of the competition. A month later, Pogba scored a similar goal in a 3–2 defeat to West Bromwich Albion in the Academy League.

On 19 February 2011, Pogba was one of four academy players promoted to the first-team squad by manager Alex Ferguson ahead of Manchester United's FA Cup fifth round match against Crawley Town, for which he was assigned the number 42 shirt. He continued in the under-18s for the rest of the season, helping the team to a lengthy run in the FA Youth Cup; in the semi-final encounter against Chelsea in the competition, Pogba scored a goal in the first leg, a 3–2 defeat, and provided the assist for the opening goal of the second leg, a 4–0 win. In the final, Manchester United defeated Sheffield United 6–3 on aggregate to win their tenth Youth Cup title; Pogba started and played the entire match in both legs.

2011–12 season
Ahead of the start of the 2011–12 season, Ferguson confirmed that Pogba would feature with the senior team during the season, stating, "I mean if we hold Pogba back, what's going to happen? He's going to leave. You know, in a couple of years' time when his contract is going to finish. So we have to give him the opportunity to see how he can do in the first-team and he's got great ability." Pogba was promoted to the club's reserve team permanently for the 2011–12 season and made his first appearance of the season on 15 August 2011 in the team's opening Premier Reserve League match against Arsenal. On 25 August, in the team's second league match against Swansea City reserves, Pogba scored the second goal in a 6–0 rout. On 19 September, he was named to the first team to participate in their Football League Cup tie against Leeds United the following day, with Ferguson proclaiming, "I intend to play him [Pogba] against Leeds United." Pogba appeared as a half-time substitute to make his professional debut as Manchester United won the match 3–0. Pogba made his second appearance against Aldershot Town in the Fourth Round of the League Cup on 25 October 2011.

Pogba made his Premier League debut against Stoke City on 31 January 2012, replacing Javier Hernández in the 72nd minute. He made another substitute appearance against West Bromwich Albion on 11 March. Four days later, he made his European debut in the second leg of the team's UEFA Europa League round of 16 tie against Spanish club Athletic Bilbao; he appeared as a substitute in the 2–1 away defeat, coming on for Michael Carrick in the 63rd minute as Manchester United lost the tie 5–3 on aggregate.

Juventus

2012–13 season

On 3 July 2012, Manchester United manager Alex Ferguson confirmed that Pogba had left the club after not signing a new contract. Ferguson stated that Pogba had signed for Italian club Juventus "a long time ago as far as we're aware." Ferguson also accused Pogba of disrespecting Manchester United, saying, "It is disappointing. I don't think he showed us any respect at all, to be honest. I'm quite happy that if they [footballers] carry on that way, they're probably better doing it away from us." On 27 July, Juventus confirmed on their official website that Pogba had undergone a medical at the club, and the transfer was completed on 3 August, when he signed a four-year contract. He made his first appearance for Juventus in a pre-season friendly against Benfica in Geneva on 1 August, coming on as a 78th-minute substitute for Andrea Pirlo.

Pogba's first competitive appearance with Juventus came in the Serie A match against Chievo on 22 September 2012, where he played the full 90 minutes. On 2 October, Pogba made his first appearance in the UEFA Champions League in a 1–1 home draw against Shakhtar Donetsk, and on 20 October, Pogba scored his first goal for the club in a 2–0 win over Napoli. On 31 October, he started against Bologna and scored the game-winning goal in a 2–1 victory. Pogba also contributed to the opening goal scored by Fabio Quagliarella. The midfielder was subsequently praised for his performance in the match by several Italian media outlets such as la Repubblica, Il Messaggero and La Gazzetta dello Sport.

On 5 May 2013, Pogba was sent off in Juventus' Scudetto-clinching game for spitting towards an opponent after being slapped in the face.

2013–14 season

On 18 August 2013, Pogba was a key protagonist of Juventus' 4–0 win over Lazio, the match that won Juventus the 2013 Italian Supercoppa. During the match, Pogba replaced Claudio Marchisio and scored the first goal of the game; he was elected Man of the Match. In December, Pogba was named 2013's Golden Boy for the best young player in Europe.

In January 2014, Pogba was named by The Guardian as one of the ten most promising young players in Europe. On 20 February, Pogba scored his first goal in UEFA club competitions as Juventus defeated Trabzonspor 2–0 at home in the first leg of the round of 32 of the 2013–14 UEFA Europa League. On 14 April, Pogba produced an assist in Juventus's 2–0 win over Udinese, the same team that Pogba scored two magnificent goals against in the previous season. Later that week, Pogba scored the only goal in Juventus's 1–0 win over Bologna. Pogba was also named the man of the match for his performance. Pogba would prove to be a key player for the club that season, breaking into the starting line-up, and making more appearances (51) for the club than any other player across all competitions that season, also scoring 9 goals. He finished the season with his second consecutive Serie A title under manager Antonio Conte, also reaching the semi-finals of the Europa League.

2014–15 season

On 20 September 2014, under new Juventus manager Massimiliano Allegri, Pogba contributed to Juventus's away win against Milan by providing the assist for the only goal of the game, scored by Carlos Tevez. Later that month, on 18 October, Pogba saved Juventus from a defeat against Sassuolo by scoring a decisive equaliser; he was later named Man of the Match. On 24 October, Pogba renewed his contract with Juventus, tying him to the club until 2019. On 4 November, on his 100th appearance with the club, Pogba scored Juventus's third goal against Olympiacos in the Champions League, helping them to win the match; this was his first ever Champions League goal. On 22 November, he scored his first brace of the season in a 3–0 win against Lazio at the Stadio Olimpico in Rome. On 28 October, Pogba was named as one of the 23 shortlisted candidates for the 2014 Ballon d'Or; at 21, he was the youngest on the list. In 2014, Pogba was awarded the Bravo Award, by the Italian sports magazine Il Guerin Sportivo, which is awarded to the best under-23 player who has participated in European competitions.

On 11 January 2015, Pogba helped Juventus secure their first win against Napoli at the Stadio San Paolo in 14 years as he scored a volley that helped Juventus beat Napoli 1–3. On 15 January, he scored his first goal in the Coppa Italia as Juventus defeated Verona 6–1 in the round of 16 of the tournament. On 9 March, Pogba scored the only goal in a 1–0 victory against Sassuolo to put Juventus 11 points clear of Roma at the top of the league table. In the second leg of Juventus's round of 16 tie against Borussia Dortmund, Pogba was taken off during the first half after injuring his hamstring and was later ruled out for two months. He returned to the starting line-up on 9 May, scoring in a 1–1 home draw against Cagliari, as Juventus celebrated winning their fourth consecutive Serie A title since 2012. On 13 May, Pogba set up Álvaro Morata's equaliser against Real Madrid in the second leg of the Champions League semi-final; the goal allowed Juventus win the tie 3–2 on aggregate to advance to the Champions League Final for the first time in 12 years. On 20 May, Pogba set up Juventus's first goal as they defeated Lazio 2–1 at the Stadio Olimpico in the 2015 Coppa Italia Final. On 6 June 2015, Pogba started for Juventus in the 2015 UEFA Champions League Final as the club were defeated 3–1 by Barcelona at Berlin's Olympiastadion.

2015–16 season
On 15 July 2015, Pogba was named to the ten-man shortlist for the 2015 UEFA Best Player in Europe Award. For the 2015–16 season, he was awarded the prestigious number-10 shirt, following Carlos Tevez's departure, which had previously been worn by Alessandro Del Piero, Roberto Baggio and Michel Platini. On 8 August, he assisted a goal in Juventus's 2–0 win over Lazio in the 2015 Supercoppa Italiana. On 12 August, it was announced that he placed tenth in the 2015 UEFA Best Player in Europe Award. On 31 October, Pogba made his 100th Serie A appearance in a 2–1 home win over Torino in the Turin Derby, also scoring Juventus's opening goal from a half-volley from outside the area. On 24 November, Pogba was nominated for the 2015 UEFA Team of the Year, later being named to the team on 8 January 2016. Three days later he was named to the 2015 FIFA FIFPro World XI. Pogba excelled in his team's new creative position, which saw him gain more time on the ball, and played a key role in helping Juventus to the league title, scoring a joint personal best of 8 goals in Serie A, while also finishing the league season as the top assist provider in Serie A, with a personal record of 12 assists, alongside Miralem Pjanić.

Return to Manchester United

2016–17 season

On 8 August 2016, Pogba returned to former club, Manchester United, on a five-year contract for a then-record for highest football transfer fee at €105 million (£89.3 million) plus bonuses of €5 million, surpassing the former record holder Gareth Bale. Paul Pogba's agent, Mino Raiola, received a reported €27 million from Juventus when he re-joined Manchester United; Juventus disclosed the fee as an auxiliary expense, for €26.154 million. The Football Association announced that Pogba would be suspended for Manchester United's opening Premier League fixture of the 2016–17 season against AFC Bournemouth, due to two yellow cards he had accumulated in the previous season's edition of the Coppa Italia with Juventus. On 19 August, he made his first appearance since returning to the club in a 2–0 home victory over Southampton in the Premier League.

After the 2–1 defeat at home in the first Manchester derby of the season on 10 September, Pogba was criticised for his lack of discipline in positioning by pundit Jamie Carragher. Pogba, however, soon recovered to form and scored his first Premier League goal for United with a header against defending champions Leicester City in a 4–1 home win on 24 September. He then scored twice, once from the penalty spot and then with a strike from distance, in a Europa League tie against Fenerbahçe on 20 October. Manager José Mourinho defended Pogba after the game, criticising football's "Einsteins" for being too quick to judge the player.

In January 2017, Pogba scored in a 2–1 away defeat to Hull City in the second leg of the EFL Cup semi-final, which allowed Manchester United to advance to the final 3–2 on aggregate. On 24 May 2017, Pogba scored in the 18th minute of the Europa League final against Dutch club AFC Ajax, which proved to be the game-winning goal as Manchester United defeated Ajax 2–0 to win United's first continental trophy in nine years. Manchester United finished the 2016–17 Premier League season in sixth place, with Pogba being involved in 30 games, scoring five goals and providing four assists.

2017–18 season
Pogba scored the fourth goal in a 4–0 victory over West Ham United on the opening weekend of the 2017–18 Premier League season. During a 3–0 defeat of Basel during the 2017–18 UEFA Champions League group stage, Pogba tore his left hamstring and was expected to miss eight matches. He returned to action on 18 November in a 4–1 win over Newcastle United, assisting Anthony Martial with a cross from the flank and scored United's third goal. In his first game of 2018, on 1 January, Pogba provided assists for both goals as Manchester United defeated Everton 2–0. Throughout the next few months, Pogba was again the subject of criticism regarding a lack of discipline and for not fulfilling his defensive duties. He was absent from several pivotal games in favour of Scott McTominay, including Manchester United's 2–1 victory over rivals Liverpool and was only used as a late substitution as his side were eliminated from the Champions League in the round of 16 by Sevilla in March.

The day before the Manchester derby, Manchester City manager Pep Guardiola claimed that Pogba's agent, Mino Raiola, had offered Pogba to play for his side, which Raiola denied. In the derby at Etihad Stadium on 7 April, Pogba scored two goals in quick succession as Manchester United came back to defeat their rivals 3–2 after conceding two goals in the first half. The victory also prevented Manchester City from securing the Premier League title against them, which they later did as Manchester United finished the season as runners-up. In the 2018 FA Cup Final against Chelsea, his side were defeated 1–0, with Pogba squandering a chance to equalise with a header in the penalty box.

2018–19 season
Due to the absence of team captain Antonio Valencia, Pogba took over temporary captaincy of the club in the opening games of the 2018–19 season. Pogba began the season well in the first few weeks, scoring four goals as the new designated penalty taker. However following a series of disappointing results, Mourinho announced that Pogba would not captain the team again. In late September, Pogba and Mourinho were filmed having a confrontation during a training session, despite Mourinho's assertion that there was "no problem" between the two. Despite this, Pogba continued to play in the starting eleven and scored in United's 2–1 victory over Everton. However, following a spell of poor form and strained relationship with Mourinho, Pogba found himself benched and linked with an exit from Manchester United during the January transfer season. Continuing tensions between Pogba and Mourinho saw him branded a "virus" who influenced United's bad form by the manager. Pogba continued to be benched throughout the next few games up until and including United's match against Liverpool where Manchester United lost 3–1. Shortly after this match however Mourinho was sacked as Manchester United manager, and Ole Gunnar Solskjær was appointed as the caretaker manager one day later.

Under new manager, Ole Gunnar Solskjær, Pogba saw a revival in his form as he scored twice consecutively against Huddersfield Town and Bournemouth. In January 2019, Pogba assisted Marcus Rashford's game-winning goal against Tottenham Hotspur, with consecutive goals in the following matches against Brighton & Hove Albion and Burnley. Pogba then scored a brace in a 3–0 away win over Fulham and was named man of the match; his two goals brought his seasonal tally to a personal best of 11 league goals and 13 in all competitions. Pogba continued this trend by scoring again in United's FA Cup fifth round tie against Chelsea where United won 2–0 and got an assist in a 3–1 win against Crystal Palace. Pogba's form dipped towards the end of the season as Manchester United only won 2 of their last 12 games of the season as they were knocked out of the FA cup by Wolverhampton Wanderers. Pogba was also criticised for his performance in the Champions League quarter final as Manchester United lost to Barcelona 4–0 on aggregate. In that poor run of games, Pogba did manage to score a brace in a 2–1 home win against West Ham. On the final day of the Premier League season, Pogba started for Manchester United as they lost to Cardiff City 2–0 at Old Trafford and after the game, Pogba was seen talking to some fans who were throwing him abuse. Despite the poor end to the season, Pogba had the most productive season of his career as he scored 16 goals and got 11 assists in all competition and was named in the PFA team of the year, despite his inconsistent form.

2019–20 season
During the summer of 2019, Pogba hinted that his time at the club was coming to an end as he said "it could be a good time to have a new challenge somewhere else" with Real Madrid and Juventus being linked to the player. Despite the speculation of Pogba leaving, he participated in United's preseason. Towards the end of July, Manchester United rejected a £27.6 million plus James Rodríguez offer from Real Madrid for Paul Pogba as they felt the offer fell way below their evaluation of the player.

Pogba started for Manchester United in their opening game in the Premier League on 11 August 2019, providing two assists in the club's 4–0 home win over Chelsea. In a post-game interview, Pogba said even though he was a Manchester United player, a "question mark" remained over his future. Pogba suffered racist abuse on social media after missing a penalty during a 1–1 away draw against Wolverhampton Wanderers the following game.

On 31 August, Pogba suffered an ankle injury in a 1–1 draw against Southampton, putting him out of action for one month. His return to the squad was in a League Cup penalty shootout win over Rochdale. Pogba then featured in the following game, a 1–1 home draw against Arsenal, where he suffered a recurrence of his injury but also made his 100th appearance for the club. In late October it was announced that due to his injury, he would be out until December 2019, and his return was delayed by illness. Pogba made two appearances from the bench in late December against Watford and Newcastle United before suffering a second recurrence of his injury. In January 2020, Pogba underwent surgery on his ankle putting him out of action for a further four to eight weeks.

In May 2020, manager Ole Gunnar Solskjær announced that Pogba would be fit to play following the return to football during project restart. In United's first game of the restart, Pogba came on as a substitute and won a penalty which Bruno Fernandes converted, resulting in a 1–1 draw against Tottenham Hotspur. On 24 June, Pogba made his first start since September in a 3–0 crushing of Sheffield United.

On 9 July, Pogba scored his first goal of the season as United won 3–0 at Aston Villa.

2020–21 season
Pogba scored his first goal of the 2020–21 season against Brighton & Hove Albion in the fourth round of the EFL Cup on 30 September 2020, scoring from a deflected free kick to give United a 3–0 win. On 18 March 2021, he scored the winning goal in a 1–0 away win over Milan in the UEFA Europa League round of 16, to help his team to win 2–1 on aggregate and reach the quarter-finals.

2021–22 season

In the opening match of the Premier League season on 14 August, Pogba provided four assists in a 5–1 victory over rivals Leeds United. In doing so, he became just the seventh player in Premier League history to register four assists in a single match, the first United player to achieve the feat, and eclipsed his entire assist tally of the previous season of three. 

His only goal of the season came in a 1–1 draw with Burnley in the Premier League on 8 February 2022.

On 1 June 2022, Manchester United announced that Pogba would leave the club following the expiration of his contract.

Return to Juventus

2022–23 season
On 11 July 2022, Juventus announced Pogba's return on a four-year contract. On 26 July, Pogba injured the meniscus in his knee and was sidelined for two months. The injury later required surgery that ruled him out until at least after the 2022 FIFA World Cup.

International career

Youth
Pogba began his international career for France with the national youth football team and earned caps at all levels for which he was eligible. Prior to his international debut, Pogba was named captain of the under-16 team by coach Guy Ferrier. He made his youth international debut on 23 September 2008 in the team's opening match of the campaign against Wales in Llanelli. France won the match 4–2. Under Pogba's leadership, the team recorded impressive victories over Uruguay and Italy in the Tournoi du Val-de-Marne and defeated the Republic of Ireland by an aggregate score of 8–2 over the course of two matches. On 31 January 2009, he scored his first youth international goal in the 2009 Aegean Cup Final against Norway. The goal gave France a 1–0 lead and the team won the match 2–1 to win the tournament.

He was a part of the team that played at the 2010 UEFA European Under-17 Championship scoring both of his goals with the team at the tournament. He scored the only goal in the team's 1–0 victory over Portugal in the group stage and netted his second in the team's 2–1 loss to England in the semi-finals. Following the departure of Ferrier as the team's youth international coach, Pogba was re-instated as captain at his age level by new coach Pierre Mankowski. Mankowski had previously been the assistant manager of the senior national team under the reign of Raymond Domenech. Pogba made his under-18 debut on 27 October 2010 at the Tournio de Limoges against Greece in a 4–1 victory. On 24 March 2011, Pogba scored his first goal with the team netting the game-winning goal in a 2–1 win over Germany. The goal was scored from over  out.

Pogba made his debut with the under-19 team in its first match of the season against Italy on 6 September 2011. In the match, he assisted on two goals, scored by Jean-Christophe Bahebeck and Anthony Koura, in a 3–1 victory. On 29 February 2012, he scored his first goal for the team in a 2–1 defeat to Spain. In Elite Round qualification for the 2012 UEFA European Under-19 Championship, Pogba scored the fifth goal in the team's 6–0 rout of the Netherlands. The victory qualified France for the competition. On 11 June 2012, Pogba was named to the squad to participate in the tournament. In the team's opening group stage match against Serbia, he converted a penalty in a 3–0 win. France reached the semi-finals where the team faced Spain. In the match, with France trailing 3–2 in extra time, Pogba scored the equalising goal three minutes prior to the match's completion to send it to penalties. However, despite Pogba converting the opening penalty for France, Les Bleuets were defeated 4–2.

Due to the under-19 team's semi-final appearance in the 2012 UEFA European Under-19 Championship, the nation qualified for the 2013 FIFA U-20 World Cup, which merited under-20 team appearances for Pogba. Similar to the previous two seasons, Pogba was installed as captain by Mankowski and made his under-20 debut in a 0–0 draw against China. In the team's next match against North Korea, Pogba scored the team's second goal in a 3–1 win. Pogba was the captain of the team that won France's first ever FIFA U-20 World Cup. In that tournament held in Turkey, he played every minute of all of France's matches except for the final group match against Spain, in which he was an unused substitute. He was named the best player of the tournament.

Senior

Early career and 2014 World Cup

On 22 March 2013, Pogba made his debut for the French senior team in a 2014 World Cup qualifier against Georgia. He played the full 90 minutes in a 3–1 win. He scored his first international goal against Belarus on 10 September 2013 in a 4–2 victory, once again during a 2014 World Cup qualifier.

On 6 June 2014, Pogba was named in France's squad for the 2014 FIFA World Cup. On 15 June, he started in central midfield in the team's first World Cup fixture – a 3–0 victory over Honduras – suffering a foul from Wilson Palacios which led to a red card for the Honduran and a penalty kick, which was converted by Karim Benzema to give France the lead. He appeared as a substitute in the team's second match, assisting a goal for Benzema in a 5–2 victory of Switzerland. In the round of 16, Pogba scored a 79th minute opening goal and was named man of the match by FIFA as Les Bleus defeated Nigeria 2–0 in Brasília. France were eliminated in the quarter-finals of the competition following a 1–0 defeat to eventual champions Germany on 4 July with Pogba giving away the free kick from which the Germans eventually scored. On 13 July 2014, Pogba was named the tournament's Best Young Player.

Euro 2016
In May 2016, Pogba was named by national side manager Didier Deschamps to France's 23-man squad for UEFA Euro 2016, to be played on home soil. Although much was expected of Pogba at the upcoming European Championships, in France's opening match of the tournament, a 2–1 win over Romania on 10 June, he endured criticism for his perceived negative performance after being played out of position and was subsequently left on the bench by Deschamps for his nation's second group match, later coming on as a second-half substitute in a 2–0 win over Albania. In the round of 16, he was once again the target of media scrutiny for conceding an early penalty against Ireland, prompting former England international Gary Lineker to tweet: “Is Pogba the world's most overrated player?”; France eventually came from behind to win the match 2–1.

In the quarter-final match against Iceland on 3 July, at the Stade de France, Pogba was able to recapture his form, putting on a dominant performance in his new midfield role, as he scored his nation's second goal of the night from a header following Antoine Griezmann's corner, which he had previously helped to obtain; he later started the play which led to Griezmann's goal, as the host nation advanced to the semi-finals of the competition following a 5–2 win. In the semi-final match against Germany four days later, Pogba was once again started in a deep-lying midfield role alongside Blaise Matuidi in a 4–2–3–1 formation; following N'Golo Kanté's introduction in the second half, he was shifted to a more advanced role, which gave him more tactical freedom, and he subsequently helped to create Griezmann's second goal of the match, as the hosts defeated the reigning World Cup Champions 2–0 to advance to the final of the tournament, where they suffered a 1–0 extra-time defeat to Portugal.

2018 World Cup victory
On 17 May 2018, Pogba was named in the France squad for the 2018 FIFA World Cup in Russia. On 16 June 2018, he took the shot that deflected off Aziz Behich and resulted in the winning goal in France's 2–1 win over Australia in their opening match at the tournament. The goal was initially awarded to Pogba, but the following day FIFA re-awarded it as an own goal to Behich.

In the 59th minute of the 2018 FIFA World Cup Final, Pogba extended France's lead over Croatia to 3–1 with a strike from the edge of the penalty area after his initial shot had been blocked. France eventually won the World Cup by a score of 4–2.

Euro 2020
On 23 June 2021, in France's final group match of UEFA Euro 2020 against Portugal, Pogba assisted Karim Benzema's second goal in a 2–2 draw, which saw them top their group. He later scored with a bending 25-yard strike in the round-of-16 match against Switzerland, where France were knocked out of the tournament on penalties after a 3–3 draw.

2022 World Cup
Pogba was ruled out of the 2022 FIFA World Cup following knee surgery.

Style of play

Primarily a central midfielder, although he is also capable of playing on the left flank, in a holding role, as a deep-lying playmaker, in a box-to-box role, or even as an attacking midfielder, Pogba was described by Manchester United as a "powerful, skilful, and creative" player who has "an eye for goal and a penchant for the spectacular." He is also capable of playing as an offensive–minded central midfielder, who will often drift out wide, known as the "mezzala" role in Italy. During his time in Italy, he gained the nicknames Il Polpo Paul ("Paul the Octopus") for his long legs that look like tentacles during tackling or running and "Pogboom" for his explosive playing style and energy on the pitch. A large, quick, hard-working and physically strong player, he excels in the air and is also known for his stamina, as well as his powerful and accurate striking ability from distance; he has also drawn praise for his finesse, technique, flair and dribbling skills, as well as his ability to hold up the ball. His characteristics and playing role in midfield initially led him to be compared with former France international Patrick Vieira in his youth. He is also known for his ability to make forward surging runs from deeper areas of the pitch.

During his final season with Juventus, Pogba was deployed in a more advanced and creative midfield role rather than in his usual box-to-box role, which saw him gain more time on the ball, and he excelled as the team's main playmaker, due to his vision and passing range; his performances in this role saw him develop from a promising youngster into one of the best and most complete midfielders in the world. Upon Pogba's departure from Juventus in 2016, his former teammate Gianluigi Buffon compared him to French former playmakers Michel Platini and Zinedine Zidane, and also praised his ability, leadership, work-rate and attitude, both on the pitch and in training, stating that he "...is a tremendous warrior on the pitch but also has so much talent. His control of the ball and the way he can swiftly change the play from defence to attack is special." Pogba is also an effective free kick and penalty taker. Despite his talent, however, he has been accused of being inconsistent by certain pundits. Moreover, he has also struggled with injuries during his time with Manchester United.

Personal life
Pogba is a practicing Muslim. He has been married to Bolivian model María Zulay Salaues since 2019, and they have two children together. Pogba is also multilingual; other than his native French, he is also fluent in English, Italian and Spanish.

In August 2017, Pogba spoke about the possibility of openly gay footballers in the Premier League. During a UEFA respect campaign in Monaco, Pogba said of potential gay footballers that they should be considered "equal", stating further that what "he does in his private life has nothing to do with the player ... You have just to respect him ... [because] We are all equal when we play football."

In March 2022, Pogba said that he had suffered from depression whilst being managed by Jose Mourinho at Manchester United during 2018.

In August 2022, it was revealed that large sums of money were demanded from Pogba to avoid the dissemination of videos allegedly compromising him. His brother Mathias Pogba was accused of being involved. Two investigations were opened on suspicion of extortion attempts, one in France, the other in Italy.

Media and sponsorships
Pogba has a sponsorship deal with sportswear and equipment supplier Adidas. He appeared in an Adidas 2018 World Cup commercial along with other players in the Adidas stable, including David Beckham, Lionel Messi and Mohamed Salah, as well as American singer Pharrell Williams.

Appearing in EA Sports' FIFA video game series, Pogba's goal celebration, 'the Dab', was first featured in FIFA 17. Pogba, with his brothers Florentin and Mathias, attended the 2017 MTV Europe Music Awards in London, where Paul and English actress Natalie Dormer presented the "Best Song" award to Canadian singer Shawn Mendes.

Pogba is also a playable operator in Call of Duty: Modern Warfare II.

Career statistics

Club

International

France score listed first, score column indicates score after each Pogba goal

Honours
Juventus
 Serie A: 2012–13, 2013–14, 2014–15, 2015–16
 Coppa Italia: 2014–15, 2015–16
 Supercoppa Italiana: 2013, 2015

Manchester United

 UEFA Europa League: 2016–17 runner-up: 2020–21
 EFL Cup: 2016–17

France U20
 FIFA U-20 World Cup: 2013

France

 UEFA European Championship runner-up: 2016
 FIFA World Cup: 2018
 UEFA Nations League: 2020–21

Individual
 UEFA European Under-17 Championship Team of the Tournament: 2010
 UEFA European Under-19 Championship Team of the Tournament: 2012
 FIFA U-20 World Cup Golden Ball: 2013
 Golden Boy: 2013
 Serie A Team of the Year: 2013–14, 2014–15, 2015–16
 FIFA World Cup Young Player Award: 2014
 Bravo Award: 2014
 UEFA Team of the Year: 2015
 FIFA FIFPro World11: 2015
 ESM Team of the Year: 2015–16, 2018–19
UEFA Europa League Squad of the Season: 2016–17, 2020–21
UEFA Europa League Player of the Season: 2016–17
 PFA Team of the Year: 2018–19 Premier League

Orders
 Knight of the Legion of Honour: 2018

References

External links

 Paul Pogba profile at the Juventus F.C. website
 
 
 
 
 

1993 births
Black French sportspeople
Living people
People from Lagny-sur-Marne
Golden Boy winners
Footballers from Seine-et-Marne
French sportspeople of Guinean descent
French footballers
France youth international footballers
France under-21 international footballers
France international footballers
Association football midfielders
US Torcy players
Le Havre AC players
Manchester United F.C. players
Juventus F.C. players
Premier League players
Serie A players
FA Cup Final players
UEFA Europa League winning players
2014 FIFA World Cup players
UEFA Euro 2016 players
2018 FIFA World Cup players
UEFA Euro 2020 players
FIFA World Cup-winning players
UEFA Nations League-winning players
French expatriate footballers
Expatriate footballers in England
Expatriate footballers in Italy
French expatriate sportspeople in England
French expatriate sportspeople in Italy
Chevaliers of the Légion d'honneur
French Muslims
Paul